The following is an extensive catalogue of the variants and specific unique elements of each variant and/or design stage of the Boeing B-17 Flying Fortress, a heavy bomber used by the United States Army Air Forces and other Allied air forces during World War II.

Boeing Model 299 (XB-17) 

The Model 299 was the original bomber design built by Boeing to fulfill an August 1934 requirement by the United States Army Air Corps for a bomber capable of carrying 2,000 lb (907 kg) of bombs 2,000 mi (3,218 km) at 200 mph (322 km/h). It carried a bomb load of eight  bombs, with a defensive armament of five .30 caliber machine guns, with one in a nose turret and one each in dorsal and ventral mounts and two in waist blisters. In 1935, Boeing's Model 299 competed with several entries by other aircraft companies at an evaluation at Wright Field near Dayton, Ohio, USA.

On its flight from Seattle, Washington to Wright Field for the competition, the 299 set a nonstop speed record of 252 mph (406 km/h). Though it crashed and burned on takeoff during a demonstration, the crash was due to flight-crew error, not from any flaw in the aircraft. Subsequent implementation of a mandatory pre-flight checklist prior to take-off ensured avoidance of flight crew error. Despite the crash (and more important, its much higher cost per unit), Army Air Corps leaders were impressed by the bomber's performance, so Boeing was awarded an initial development contract. The aircraft has since been referred to as the XB-17, but this designation is not contemporary or official.

Y1B-17 (YB-17)

Though still enthusiastic about the Boeing design, despite it being disqualified from the fly-off contest following the crash of the Model 299 prototype, the Army Air Corps cut its order from 65 service test YB-17s to just 13. On November 20, 1936, the bomber's normal acquisition funding was changed to "F-1" , and the heavy YB-17 bomber was redesignated "Y1B-17", as a result.

Unlike its predecessor, which had used Pratt & Whitney R-1690 Hornet radial engines, the Y1B-17 used the more powerful Wright R-1820 Cyclone that would become the standard power plant on all B-17s produced. Several changes were also made in the armament, and the crew was reduced from seven to six. Most changes were minor: the most notable was switching from double-wishbone to single-arm landing gear for ease of regular maintenance.

On 7 December 1936, five days after the first flight of the Y1B-17, the brakes on the bomber fused during landing, and it nosed over. Though damage was minimal, the cumulative impact of this event, combined with the crash of the Model 299, triggered a Congressional investigation. Following the crash, the Army Air Corps was put on notice: another such crash would mean the end of the bomber's "F-1" procurement program.

Though the heavy bombers were meant for testing, the commander of Army General Headquarters (Air Force), Major General Frank Andrews, decided to assign twelve Y1B-17s to the 2nd Bomb Group located at Langley Field, Virginia. Andrews reasoned that it was best to develop heavy bombing techniques as quickly as possible. Of the thirteen Boeing aircraft built, one was assigned for stress testing.

In 1937, the twelve Y1B-17s at Langley Field represented the entire fleet of American heavy bombers. Most of the time spent with the bombers entailed eliminating problems with the aircraft. The most important development was the use of a detailed checklist, to be reviewed by the pilot and copilot just prior to each takeoff. It was hoped that this procedure would prevent accidents similar to that which led to the loss of Boeing's Model 299 prototype.

In May 1938, the Y1B-17s (now redesignated just B-17) of the 2nd Bombardment Group, led by the lead bombers' navigator Curtis LeMay, took part in a demonstration in which they intercepted the Italian liner Rex. Coming into contact with the liner while it was still 610 mi (982 km) out at sea, the demonstration was meant to prove the range and navigational superiority of the B-17. It also showed that the bomber would be an effective tool for attacking a naval invasion force before it could reach the United States. The Navy was furious about the Army's intrusion into their mission, and forced the War Department to issue an order restricting the Army Air Corps from operating more than a hundred miles from America's coastline.

After three years of flight, no serious incidents occurred with the B-17s. In October 1940, they were transferred to the 19th Bombardment Group at March Field.

B-17A (Y1B-17A)

The aircraft that became the sole Y1B-17A was originally ordered as a static test bed. However, when one of the Y1B-17s survived an inadvertent violent spin during a flight in a thunderhead, Army Air Corps leaders decided that the bomber was exceptionally robust and that there would be no need for static testing. Instead, it was used as a testbed for enhancing engine performance on the new bomber. After studying a variety of configurations, use of a ventral-nacelle-mount turbocharger position was settled on for each of its four engines. A successive series of General Electric-manufactured turbochargers would equip B-17s as standard items, starting with the first production model, allowing it to fly higher and faster than the Y1B-17. When testing was completed, the Y1B-17A was reconfigured as the B-17A, serial number: 37-369.

B-17B

The B-17B (299M) was the first production model of the B-17 and was essentially a B-17A with a larger rudder, larger flaps, and a redesigned nose and 1,200 hp (895 kW) R-1820-51 engines. The small, globe-like, machine gun turret used in the Y1B-17's upper nose blister was replaced with a .30 caliber (7.62 mm) machine gun, its barrel run through a ball-socket in the ten-panel Perspex nose glazing. This was held in place by both the socket's strength combined with a flexible interior support strap, which later became an aluminum-reinforced window pane. The Y1B-17's separate triangular-shaped bombardier's aiming window, located further back in the lower nose, was eliminated, replaced with a framed window panel in the lower portion of the nose glazing; this configuration was used on all Flying Fortress airframes up through the B-17E series. All B-17B aircraft were later modified at Boeing, being brought up to the B-17C/D production standard. While the new nose glazing still used only a single .30 caliber machine gun, two additional ball-sockets were installed in the nose, one in the upper left panel and another in a lower right. This three ball-socket layout was continued up through the B-17E series. During Army Air Corps service, the bulged teardrop-shaped machine gun blisters were replaced with flush-mounted Perspex side windows of the same type used in the B-17C/D series. Various aircraft had different levels of upgrades performed. Some of the "B" series Fortresses had only their bulged side blisters replaced with slide-out flush windows, while others also had their bulged upper blister changed to a much flatter, more aerodynamic Perspex window panel. In addition, some "B" series Fortresses also had ventral "bathtub turrets" (see the "C/D" section below) installed, replacing their lower, teardrop-shaped gun blisters.

Crew locations were rearranged, and the original pneumatic brake system was replaced with more efficient hydraulic brakes.

In October 1942 all in-service B-17B aircraft were redesignated RB-17B, the "R" indicating "Restricted". These aircraft were now used only for training, transport, messenger, and liaison duties. The "R" prefix became a designation for combat obsolescence.

Many of these RB-17B aircraft, along with at least one still-airworthy YB-17, were stationed at Sebring Airfield, where the exterior scenes were filmed for the Warner Bros. war drama Air Force (1943), directed by Howard Hawks, and starring (among others) John Garfield, Arthur Kennedy, Gig Young, and Harry Carey. The film's real star, however, was an RB-17B (United States Army serial number 38-584), carrying on its upper rudder the "security-conscious" false serial number "05564". It passed as a later model B-17D Flying Fortress, having had its machine gun blisters replaced and a lower "bathtub" ventral gun turret installed. Many of these aircraft can still be seen in both ground and aerial scenes during the film.

The "B" series Flying Fortress made its maiden flight on 27 June 1939. 39 were built in a single production run, but Army Air Corps serial numbers were scattered over several batches. This was because of limited government funding: The Army Air Corps could only afford to purchase a few B-17Bs at a time.

B-17C

The B-17C was a B-17B with a number of improvements, including more powerful R-1820-65 engines. To boost crew safety, the waist-mounted machine gun blisters were replaced with teardrop-shaped, slide-out Perspex window panels flush with the fuselage, and the ventral blister was replaced by a lower metal housing dubbed a "bathtub turret", similar in appearance and general location on the lower fuselage, to the Bola ventral gondola being used on Nazi Germany's He 111P medium bomber. The most important additions made to the "C" series were self-sealing fuel tanks and defensive armor plate added to vital areas.

With the passage of the Lend-lease Act in 1941, the Royal Air Force requested B-17s. At that time, the US Army Air Corps was suffering from shortages of the B-17, but hesitantly agreed to provide 20 examples to the RAF. Though the Air Corps did not consider the B-17 ready for offensive combat, the aircraft was still desperately needed in Britain. The 20 ferried bombers were Boeing production B-17Cs (company designation Model 299T). The aircraft's single .30 caliber nose-mounted machine guns were replaced with 0.5 inch Brownings.

Following their delivery, the 20 B-17C bombers were placed immediately into frontline service and designated RAF Fortress Mk I. They performed unremarkably while in British service. By September 1941, three months after the Army Air Corps became the Army Air Forces, 39 sorties had made up 22 missions. Nearly half of those were aborted due to mechanical and electrical problems. Eight of the 20 aircraft were destroyed by September, half to various accidents. Their machine guns tended to freeze-up at high altitudes and were generally unable to effectively protect the Fortresses from German fighter attack. Their success as bombers were also limited, largely because they were unable to strike targets from the high altitudes at which the RAF flew its daylight bombing missions.

The first of the B-17C series flew in July 1940, with a total of 38 being built. The 18 remaining in Army Air Forces service, following the 20 transferred to the RAF, were upgraded to Boeing's new B-17D configuration. However, one of these bombers, B-17C 40-2047, crashed while being ferried from Salt Lake City, Utah, to Mather Army Air Base, California, on November 2, 1941.

B-17D

Though changes in the design made the Army Air Force decide that the B-17D was worthy of a new sub designation, the B-17C and B-17D were very similar. In fact, both were given the same sub designation (299H) by Boeing.

Minor changes were made, both internally and externally. Outside, the engines received a set of adjustable cowl flaps for improved cooling, and the externally-mounted bomb racks were removed. On the interior, the electrical system was revised, and another crew position was added, bringing the total number to ten. In the aft-dorsal radio compartment was a new overhead twin-.50s machine gun mount; in the central-aft section's ventral "bathtub" gun position, twin .50s were also added, as was additional armor plating. Nose gun ball sockets were added to the side windows for the first time, in a longitudinally staggered layout (the starboard ball socket was further forward than the port-side ball socket). The number of machine guns aboard brought the total armament to seven: one portable nose .30 in (7.62 mm) and six .50 in (12.7 mm). The B-17D also featured more extensive armored plate protection. A total of 42 "D" series were built, and the 18 remaining B-17Cs were converted to Boeing's new B-17D standard. The sole-surviving example of the "D" series (originally built in 1940 and nicknamed Ole Betsy by her original aircrew) is currently undergoing restoration at the National Museum of the United States Air Force in Dayton, Ohio. This B-17D was later renamed "The Swoose" by her last pilot Col. Frank Kurtz, who after the war, kept the Fortress from being scrapped; he later named his daughter, actress Swoosie Kurtz, after the bomber.

B-17E

The B-17E (299-O) was an extensive redesign of the previous B-17D. The most obvious change was the larger, completely new vertical stabilizer, originally developed for the Boeing 307 Stratoliner by George S. Schairer. The new fin had a distinctive shape for the time, with the opposite end of the fuselage retaining the ten panel bombardier's nose glazing from the B-17D.

Because experience had shown that the Flying Fortress would be vulnerable to attack from behind, both a tail gunner's position and a powered, fully traversable dorsal turret behind the cockpit, (each armed with a pair of "light-barrel" Browning AN/M2 .50 cal. machine guns), were added to the B-17E. Until this modification, aircrews had to devise elaborate maneuvers to deal with a direct attack from behind, including swinging the bomber laterally, allowing the waist gunners to alternate .50 caliber bursts at enemy fighters. (The configuration of a "3-window box" would later be implemented on the B-29, and also adopted by Soviet bombers as late as the Tupolev Tu-16 Badger, and in different form on the USAF's B-52). The teardrop-shaped sliding panels of the waist gunners were replaced by rectangular windows, located directly across the fuselage from each other, for better visibility. In the initial production run, the ventral "bathtub" machine gun emplacement of the B-17C/Ds was replaced by a remotely-sighted powered turret. It was similar to the one used as a ventral fuselage-mount Bendix remote turret of the B-25B through -D Mitchell medium bomber variants, but was difficult to use and proved to be a failure in combat. This resulted in all remaining B-17E production being fitted with a powered Sperry ball turret, manually operated from inside. These ball turrets also equipped the "F" and "G" series Flying Fortresses that followed for ventral-quarter defense.

A total of 512 were built (possibly from the July 1940-dated order from the then-USAAC for B-17s being for that specific number of airframes) making the B-17E the first mass-produced version of the Boeing B-17. One of these was later converted to the XB-38 Flying Fortress, which proved to be a failure during flight tests. The B-17E production order was too large a quantity for Boeing to handle by itself, so the Vega division of Lockheed and Douglas assisted in the manufacture of the bomber. Boeing also built a new production plant, and Douglas added one specifically for building B-17s.

In the middle of 1942, 45 B-17Es were transferred to the RAF, where they served under the designation Fortress IIA. Likely because of the shortcomings experienced with the Fortress I (B-17C), the RAF decided not to use the Fortress IIA as a daylight, high-altitude precision bomber, the role for which it had been redesigned. Rather, the new aircraft were transferred to the Coastal Command for anti-submarine patrol.

Four known examples of B-17Es still exist in museums today, none of which is currently known to be airworthy.

B-17F

The B-17F was an upgrade of the B-17E. Outwardly, both types were distinguished primarily by the ten-panel fully-framed nose glazing on the "E" series. A molded, one-piece or two-piece all plexiglas nose cone replaced this framed glazing on the "F" series (the two-piece cone had a nearly-transparent diagonal seam). Fully-feathering paddle-blade propellers were also substituted. Many internal changes were also made to improve the effectiveness, range, and load capacity of the Flying Fortress. Once placed in combat service, however, the "F" series was found to be tail-heavy. The combined weight, when fully combat-loaded, of the four rear gunners and their heavy .50 caliber ammunition, moved the bomber's center of gravity rearward from its original design point. This forced the constant use of the bomber's elevator trim tab, stressing that component to eventual failure. In combat the B-17F also proved almost immediately to have inadequate defensive protection when being attacked directly from the front. Various armament configurations of two-to-four flexible machine guns were added to the plexiglas nose cone and side window positions (the starboard position was placed further forward). Late production "F" series Flying Fortresses received substantially-enlarged bulged "cheek" mounts for their .50 caliber machine guns, then located on each side of the nose. These replaced the previous side window-mounted .50s. These "cheek" mounts allowed for firing more directly ahead. An overhead bulged dome was also added on top of the nose for use by the navigator.

The problem of head-on defense was not adequately addressed until the introduction of a powered, Bendix-designed, remotely operated "chin" turret in the final production blocks of F-series Fortresses, starting with the last 65 (86 according to some sources) B-17Fs built by Douglas, from the B-17F-70-DL production block — directly derived from its debut on the YB-40 experimental "gunship" version.

A number of other modifications were made, including re-integrating external bomb racks; because of the negative impact on both rate-of-climb and high-altitude flight performance, this configuration was rarely used and the bomb racks were once again removed.

Range and combat radius were extended with the installation in mid-production of additional fuel cells in the wings. Called "Tokyo tanks", nine self-sealing rubber-composition fuel tanks were mounted inside each wing on each side of the reinforcing joint between the inner and outer wing spars.

3,405 "F" series Flying Fortresses were built: 2,300 by Boeing, 605 by Douglas, and 500 by Lockheed (Vega). These included the famous Memphis Belle. 19 were transferred to the RAF, where they served with RAF Coastal Command as the Fortress II. Three examples of the B-17F remain in existence, including the restored Memphis Belle.

B-17G

All changes made to the Flying Fortress were incorporated into the final production version, the B-17G. These included the Bendix remotely-operated chin turret, bringing the bomber's defensive armament to thirteen .50 caliber machine guns. The waist gun windows were staggered, another carryover from the YB-40 "gunship" variant. This allowed more freedom of movement for the waist gunners. The earliest B-17Gs lacked the "cheek" machine gun mounts, as it was believed that the chin turret provided sufficient forward firepower; they were quickly reintroduced when this proved untrue. In a reversal of the B-17F's design, the starboard "cheek" machine gun mount was moved rearward and the port side mount was moved forward, just behind the edge of the bombardier's nose glazing to avoid interference with the storage of the chin turret's control yoke when it was not in use. For late production blocks of the G-series, the tail gun position was revised. Referred to as the "Cheyenne" configuration (after the modification center where it was introduced, the United Airlines Modification Center in Cheyenne, Wyoming), its guns were mounted in a new turret with a reflector sight and a much greater field of fire. Some 8,680 were built, and dozens were converted for several different uses:

 CB-17G: Troop transport version, capable of carrying 64 troops.
 DB-17G: Drone variant
 DB-17P: Drone director
 JB-17G: Engine test-bed 
 MB-17G: Missile launcher 
 QB-17L: Target drone
 QB-17N: Target drone
 RB-17G: Reconnaissance variant
 SB-17G: Rescue version, later redesignated B-17H: Featured A-1 lifeboat under fuselage. After World War II, armament on the B-17Hs was removed; it was reinstated when the Korean War began.
 TB-17G: Special duty training version
 TB-17H: Training version of B-17H
 VB-17G: VIP transport
 PB-1: This designation was given to one B-17F and one B-17G. They were used by the U.S. Navy for various test projects.
 PB-1G: This designation was given to 17 B-17Gs used by U.S. Coast Guard as air-sea rescue aircraft.
 PB-1W: This designation was given to 31 B-17Gs used by the U.S. Navy as the first airborne early warning aircraft (AWACS).

Fortress III
Eighty-five B-17Gs were transferred to the RAF, where they received the service designation Fortress III. Three were assigned to Coastal Command in the Azores and were fitted with radar before being reused by meteorological survey squadrons. The rest were operated from February 1944 by two squadrons of Bomber Command's No. 100 Group RAF at RAF Sculthorpe, where they were used to carry electronic countermeasures to confuse and jam enemy radar in support of bombing missions. These Fortress III (SD) would carry an extensive array of equipment: the Monica tail-warning receiver, the Jostle VHF jammer, airborne Grocer air-interception jammers, Gee and LORAN for navigation, and the H2S radar in the lower nose position, replacing the chin turret. They were also used as decoys during night bombing attacks. Fortress IIIs took part in various such operations until the units were disbanded in July 1945.

XB-38

The XB-38 was a modification project undertaken primarily by the Vega division of Lockheed on the ninth B-17E built. Its primary purpose was testing the feasibility of liquid-cooled Allison V-1710-89 engines. It was meant as an improved version of the B-17, and a variant that could be used if the Wright R-1820 engine became scarce. Completing the modifications took less than a year, and the XB-38 made its first flight on 19 May 1943. While it showed a slightly higher top speed, after just a few flights it had to be grounded due to a problem with engine manifold joints leaking exhaust. Following the fixing of this problem, testing continued until the ninth flight on 16 June 1943. During this flight, the starboard (third right) inboard engine caught fire, and the crew was forced to bail out. The XB-38 was destroyed and the project was cancelled. The gains in modification were minimal and would have been disruptive to the existing Flying Fortress production. Allison engines were also considered to be more badly needed for constructing fighter aircraft.

YB-40

Prior to the introduction of the P-51 Mustang, a B-17 "gunship" escort variant called the YB-40 was introduced. This aircraft differed from the standard B-17 in that a second dorsal turret was installed atop the radio operator's position between the forward dorsal turret and the waist guns, where only an upward firing single or double Browning M2 had been mounted; and a single 0.50 in (12.7 mm) machine gun at each waist station was replaced by a pair of 0.50 in (12.7 mm) guns, of basically the same twin-mount design used for the tail guns. In addition, the bombardier’s equipment was replaced with twin 0.50 in (12.7 mm) machine guns in a remotely operated "chin" turret directly under the bombardier's position, augmenting the existing "cheek" machine guns; and the bomb bay was converted to a .50 caliber  magazine. The YB-40 would provide a heavily armed gunship escort capable of accompanying the bombers all the way to a target and back. The aircraft was deemed a failure, however, because it could not keep up with standard B-17s once they had dropped their heavy bomb loads. It was withdrawn from service after just fourteen missions. (Twenty-six were built: one XB-40 prototype, 21 YB-40 pre-production aircraft, four TB-40 training aircraft.)

C-108 Flying Fortress

Four B-17s were converted to serve as cargo carriers and V.I.P. transports under the designation C-108 Flying Fortress. (Many more served in the same roles under the designations CB-17 and VB-17, respectively.) The first of them, designated XC-108, was a B-17E partially stripped of military equipment and outfitted with various living accommodations. It served as a V.I.P. transport for General Douglas MacArthur. A similar conversion was made on a B-17F, which was redesignated YC-108. The third plane, designated XC-108A, was made to test the feasibility of converting obsolete bombers to cargo aircraft. B-17E 41-2595 was chosen for the conversion. Based in India, it ferried supplies over the Himalaya to the base for the B-29 Superfortress in Chengdu, China. It proved a difficult plane to maintain, due to lack of spare parts for the Cyclone engines, and was sent back to the United States, where it was based in Bangor, Maine, and flew a cargo route to Scotland until the end of the war. It was sold to a local dealer for scrap, but the airframe survived, and is currently being restored in Illinois.  The final one was built under the designation XC-108B, and was used as a tanker to transport fuel from India to Chengdu.

F-9 Flying Fortress

Several B-17s were converted to long-range photographic reconnaissance aircraft, designated F-9 Flying Fortress. (The F- is for 'foto' and is not be confused with the post-1948 use of F- for 'fighter'.)

The first F-9 aircraft were sixteen B-17Fs, with bombing equipment replaced by photographic equipment. Some of the defensive armament was kept. An uncertain number more were converted to a similar configuration to the F-9, but differed in minor details of their cameras, and received the designation F-9A. Some of these, along with more B-17Fs, received further camera alterations and became the F-9B. The last variant designation was the F-9C, which was given to ten B-17G, converted in a similar fashion to the previous aircraft. Those surviving in 1948 were initially redesignated RB-17G (R indicating 'reconnaissance').

FB-17: Post-war redesignation of all F-9 photo-reconnaissance aircraft.

BQ-7 Aphrodite
Late in World War II, at least 25 B-17s were fitted with radio controls as BQ-7 drones for Operation Aphrodite.

The controlling B-17 would follow the BQ-7, aim to at the target and set its controls for a collision course, before itself returning. The normal cockpit lost its roof and the fairing behind it was removed.

Because the remote-control hardware was inadequate, Operation Aphrodite was riddled with problems. Between August 1944 and January 1945, 15 BQ-7s were launched against Germany, but none hit their targets, and several crew were killed, many in parachuting accidents. One BQ-7 left a  crater in Britain and another circled an English port out of control. The program was cancelled in early 1945.

PB-1 and PB-1W

The U.S. Navy (USN) received 48 B-17s towards the end of World War II, renamed PB-1 and used for maritime patrol missions. Post-war, the USN acquired 31 more B-17Gs, renamed PB-1W, and fitted with AN/APS-20 radar for Airborne Early Warning equipment and procedure development.

The Naval Air Material Center's Naval Aircraft Modification Unit (NAMU) at Johnsville, Pennsylvania modified the B-17s to PB-1W specification by sealing up the bomb bay doors and installing 300 gallon drop tanks on each wing, in addition to the "Tokyo Tanks" mounted in the outer wings, holding a total of 3,400 gallons of fuel, giving the PB-1W an endurance of 22+ hours. Initially PB-1W's retained the natural metal finish with a protective wax coat, but later the PB-1Ws were painted gloss Navy Blue overall.

The scanner for the one-megawatt AN/APS-20 Seasearch S-band Radio Detection and Ranging (RADAR), manufactured by Hazeltine Corporation/General Electric, was ventrally mounted in a bulbous housing below the redundant bomb bay, with the RADAR relay transmitter, Identification friend or foe (IFF), Radio Direction Finder (RDF), Instrument Landing System (ILS), and LOng RAnge Navigation (LORAN) also being installed during conversion.

The conversion introduced the following changes:

 Chin turret removed.
 Norden bombsight removed.
 Bombardier's station retained as a lookout post, while on ASW or airborne search and rescue (SAR) missions.
 Top forward turret removed.
 Cockpit armor removed.
 300 U.S. gallon drop tanks fitted under the outer wings.
 Extra fuel tanks in the outer wings ("Tokyo Tanks").
 AN/APS-20 Seasearch S-band Radio Detection and Ranging (RADAR), with transmitter in the fuselage and aerial in a bulbous di-electric fairing under the former bomb-bay.
 Modernized Identification, Friend or Foe (IFF).
 Radio Direction Finder (RDF).
 Instrument Landing System (ILS).
 LOng RAnge Navigation (LORAN).
 2 RADAR consoles facing aft in the former bomb-bay
 Radio operator's seat turned to face outboard.
 Waist gun positions and ball turret removed.
 Bench seats fitted for observers at the waist positions.
 Floating smoke markers carried.
 A latrine and a galley were fitted amidships.
 Tail guns and armor removed.
 Provision for spares and/or cargo to be carried in the tail section.

The crew for USN PB-1Ws consisted of six officers (Pilot in Command, Second in Command, Navigator, CIC Officer, and two RADAR Operators/Controllers) and five enlisted men (Plane Captain (now referred to as Crew Chief), 2nd Mechanic, Electronics Technician, and two Radio Operators).

First delivered to Patrol Bomber Squadron 101 (VPB-101) in the spring of 1946, the Navy was eventually to have twenty-two, out of thirty-one post-war B-17s, fully upgraded to PB-1W standard. Late in 1946, VPB-101 would move to NAS Quonset Point, Rhode Island, and be redesignated Airborne Early Warning Development Squadron Four (VX-4).

SB-17G

From 1943 to 1948, as part of Dumbo missions, 12 B-17Gs were converted to SB-17G equipped with an airborne lifeboat and ASV radar for USAAF air-sea rescue duties.

PB-1G

After the war, the United States Coast Guard (USCG) realized the need for a long range search and rescue aircraft to supplement its peace-time Sea Air Rescue (SAR) capabilities. Concurrently, the Army Air Force was retiring thousands of B-17 four-engine bombers, many still "factory-new" as they were delivered too late to see action. The USCG, always quick to take advantage of anything they could get inexpensively, requested that the Army Air Force loan eighteen of the bombers to the Coast Guard. The powerful, long-legged and stable bombers proved to be excellent additions to the Coast Guard's aviation fleet.

The Army Air Force had developed a lifeboat that was slung underneath the fuselage of a B-17 that would be dropped to survivors in the water.  A parachute rig would deploy from the lifeboat after its release and allow it to descend safely to the surface.  The Coast Guard adopted the A-1 lifeboat for many of its PB-1Gs (the naval designation for the Flying Fortress).Furthermore the PB-1Gs were equipped with an ASV radar to assist in the SAR operations. Additionally, these aircraft were also used for the International Ice Patrol while another of the versatile PB-1Gs was modified to carry a nine-lens, 1.5 million dollar, aerial camera for mapping purposes. Interestingly, the Norden bombsight, used by the B-17s in their bombing campaign against Nazi Germany, was kept with this PB-1G and used to pinpoint targets for the camera.

In total 17 PB-1Gs served with the Coast Guard from 1945 through 1959. The final flight of the last PB-1G in USCG service ended at 1:46 p.m. on Wednesday 14 October 1959 when PB-1G 77254 landed at AIRSTA Elizabeth City. She had faithfully served the nation's oldest continuous sea service for fourteen years.

See also
 List of surviving Boeing B-17 Flying Fortresses
 List of bomber aircraft
 List of military aircraft of the United States

Notes

References

Bibliography
 Baugher, J Boeing B-17 Fortress, 1999, American Military Aircraft
 
  
 Boeing Model 299, Boeing Y1B-17, Boeing Y1B-17A/B-17A,  Boeing B-17B Fortress,  B-17C, Fortress , Boeing B-17D Fortress, Boeing B-17F Fortress, BQ-7 accessed on January 12, 2005, B-17E, Fortress IIA, Vega XB-38, Boeing YB-40, Boeing C-108,  BQ-7, F-9 Photographic Reconnaissance
 
 Model 299 Crash,  Army press release,  Intercepting the Rex, Y1B-17, Y1B-17A, B-17B, B-17C,  B-17D, B-17D "The Swoose", B-17F, B-17G, B-17E, XB-38, XB-40
 Freeman, Roger. The Mighty Eighth War Manual (1991) pp. 148–153. 
 Bishop, Cliff T. Fortresses of the Big Triangle First (1986) p. 51, 
 Bowers, Peter M. Boeing Aircraft Since 1916. London: Putnam, 1989. .
 Hess, William N. Big Bombers of WWII. Ann Arbor, Michigan: Lowe & B. Hould, 1998. .
 Hess, William N. and Jim Winchester. "Boeing B-17 Flying Fortress: Queen of the Skies" Wings Of Fame. Volume 6, 1997, pp. 38–103. London: Aerospace Publishing. . .
Hickey, Lawrence J. (with Birdsall, Steve; Jonas, Madison D.; Rogers, Edwards M.; and Tagaya, Osamu). Ken’s Men Against the Empire: The Illustrated History of the 43rd Bombardment Group During World War II (Volume I: Prewar to October 1943, The B-17 Era). International Historical Research Associates, 2016. .
 Jablonski, Edward. Flying Fortress. New York: Doubleday, 1965. .
 Johnson, Frederick A. Boeing B-17 Flying Fortress (Warbird Tech Series, Volume 7). Stillwater, Minnesota: Voyageur Press, 2001. .
Listemann, Phil H. Allied Wings No. 7 Boeing Fortress Mk. I. www.raf-in-combat.com, 2009. First edition. .
 Lloyd, Alwyn T. B-17 Flying Fortress in Detail and Scale. Fallbrook, California: Aero Publishers, 1986. .
 O'Leary, Michael. Boeing B-17 Flying Fortress (Osprey Production Line to Frontline 2). Botley, Oxford, United Kingdom: Osprey Publishing, 1999. .
 B-17E 41-2595 History and Restoration
 Andrade, John M. . U.S Military Aircraft Designations and Serials since 1909. Leicester: Midland Counties Publications, First edition 1979. .
 Swanborough, Gordon and Peter M. Bowers. United States Navy Aircraft since 1911. London: Putnam, Second edition 1976. .
 Swanborough, F. G. and Peter M. Bowers. United States Military aircraft since 1909. London: Putnam, 1963

External links
 Encyclopedia of American Aircraft
 USAF Museum
 Flight article of 1942 showing difference between Fortress I and II tailplanes
 Lone Sentry's page on the B-17's Bendix Chin Turret

Variants
Lists of aircraft variants